Ghwarriepoort Pass, or just Ghwarriepoort. *English: Ghwarrie's Gate), is situated in the Eastern Cape, province of South Africa, on the national road N9, between Uniondale and Williston.

Mountain passes of the Eastern Cape